Mrs. Dery Where Are You? is a 1975 Hungarian drama film directed by Gyula Maár. It was entered into the 1976 Cannes Film Festival, where Mari Törőcsik won the award for Best Actress, playing the protagonist Mrs. Déry.

Cast
 Mari Törőcsik - Déryné
 Ferenc Kállai - Déry
 Mária Sulyok - Déry anyja
 Imre Ráday - Intendáns
 Tamás Major - Jancsó, öreg színész
 Cecília Esztergályos - Schodelné
 Kornél Gelley - Magyar úr, dilettáns színész
 András Kozák - Ifjú gróf
 András Schiff - Zongorázó fiú
 Zsuzsa Zolnay - Capuletné
 Flóra Kádár - Dajka

References

External links

1975 films
1975 drama films
Hungarian drama films
1970s Hungarian-language films
Films directed by Gyula Maár